Jacob Leiby Farm is a historic farm complex, Pennsylvania Bluestone quarry, and national historic district located in Perry Township, Berks County, Pennsylvania.  It has six contributing buildings, two contributing sites, and three contributing structures. All of the buildings are constructed of Pennsylvania Bluestone. They include a -story, five-bay by two-bay, vernacular Federal-style farmhouse (1829); -story, tenant house/blacksmith shop; Pennsylvania bank barn; wagon shed; cider house; and quarry house. The contributing structures are a bake oven, ground cellar, and large stone and earthen dam on Maiden Creek.  The contributing sites are the Pennsylvania Bluestone quarry and cemetery. The quarry ceased operation in 1884, with the death of Jacob Leiby.

It was listed on the National Register of Historic Places in 1992.

Gallery

References

Farms on the National Register of Historic Places in Pennsylvania
Historic districts on the National Register of Historic Places in Pennsylvania
Federal architecture in Pennsylvania
Houses completed in 1829
Houses in Berks County, Pennsylvania
National Register of Historic Places in Berks County, Pennsylvania
Blacksmith shops